The Daily Bugle (formerly TheDailyBugle.net) is an American faux current affairs digital series serving as the center of several viral marketing campaigns created by Sony Pictures. Based on the fictional newspaper agency of the same name appearing in several Marvel Comics publications—the YouTube videos initially began as marketing for the Marvel Cinematic Universe (MCU) film Spider-Man: Far From Home, and deal with major events depicted in the MCU and later the Sony's Spider-Man Universe (SSU) films, with the second and third seasons primarily airing on TikTok.

The first season of the news program features J. K. Simmons as J. Jonah Jameson, reprising his role from the MCU films and Sam Raimi's Spider-Man trilogy. Several other actors reprise their roles from the films, while archival footage of others is also used. The initial videos were released from October to November 2019, focusing on the immediate aftermath of Spider-Man: Far From Home. A second season, leading up to the events of the sequel Spider-Man: No Way Home and featuring Angourie Rice reprising her role as Betty Brant, began in November 2021. A third season, leading up to the events of the SSU film Morbius and featuring Nicque Marina as a fictionalized version of herself, released in March 2022, separately from the No Way Home videos.

The videos are accompanied by additional marketing materials, such as in-universe web articles and social media posts. The series has been received positively, seen as better than average viral marketing campaigns, and as a fun and insightful expansion of the MCU for fans of the franchise.

Spider-Man: Far From Home campaign (2019)

Spider-Man: No Way Home campaign (2021–2022) 

Episodes six through eight and eleven are Burning Questions with Betty Brant episodes. The campaign released additional videos as a bonus feature with Spider-Man: No Way Home (2021) digital release in March 2022, with further episodes being released in April.

Morbius campaign (2022)

Cast and characters 
 J. K. Simmons as J. Jonah Jameson (seasons 1–2), the presenter of The Daily Bugle who is carrying out a media smear campaign against the vigilante Spider-Man.
 Angourie Rice as Betty Brant (season 2), Peter Parker's classmate at the Midtown School of Science and Technology and a new (unpaid) intern at The Daily Bugle who has been put in charge of its TikTok account. She often attempts to counter Jameson's defamation of Parker having known him personally, much to his dismay.
 Nicque Marina as a fictionalized version of herself (season 3), a new social correspondent at The Daily Bugle reporting on the crime spree of Dr. Michael Morbius.

Also reprising their roles from the Marvel Cinematic Universe (MCU) films are Tony Revolori as social media influencer Eugene "Flash" Thompson, Hannibal Buress as Midtown High gym teacher Coach Wilson, Jacob Batalon as Ned Leeds, and Tom Holland as Peter Parker / Spider-Man, with Jake Gyllenhaal appearing as Quentin Beck / Mysterio via archive footage from Spider-Man: Far From Home. In the third season, footage of Jared Leto and Adria Arjona as Dr. Michael Morbius and Martine Bancroft  from the Sony's Spider-Man Universe (SSU) film Morbius is used.

Production 
From 2002 to 2007, the character of J. Jonah Jameson was featured in a trilogy of live-action films directed by Sam Raimi, serving as a major source of comic relief throughout the series, retaining a dislike for Spider-Man and taking delight in anything that might discredit or defame him, but remains a good man at his core. After reprising the role in numerous animated projects, Simmons expressed interest in reprising the role in live-action in Marc Webb's The Amazing Spider-Man duology in April 2014, should the studio offer him the role.

Simmons ultimately reprised his role as a re-imagined alternate reality version of J. Jonah Jameson in Spider-Man: Far From Home, released in the United States on July 2, 2019, making him the first live-action character to be portrayed by the same actor in two different franchises, also reprising the role as the same incarnation of the character in Sony's Spider-Man Universe. Contrastingly to his original depiction, J. Jonah Jameson appears as the host of TheDailyBugle.net, a sensationalist "InfoWars-type video platform."  Director Jon Watts noted that Simmons' performance was over-the-top in Raimi's films, but now that same performance has real-world comparisons, such as Alex Jones. According to Kevin Feige, the changes in the real world also meant that moving the character from a newspaper editor to a "radical right news journalist that kind of scream[s] in front of the camera" made more sense. Simmons said he and Watts did not see "eye to eye" on the film's contemporary portrayal of the character versus his performance in Raimi's films.

Simmons announced that he has signed on to play J. Jonah Jameson for more films in the MCU and the SSU; following the home media release of Spider-Man: Far From Home by Sony Pictures Home Entertainment on digital on September 17, 2019, and on Ultra HD Blu-ray, Blu-ray, and DVD on October 1, a viral marketing series of shorts starring Simmons, expanding upon his role in and set immediately after the events of Far From Home running the faux news program TheDailyBugle.net, including an in-character Twitter account. Footage of Simmons as Jameson, implied to be part the Spider-Man: No Way Home promotional campaign, appears in the mid-credits scene of the 2021 SSU film Venom: Let There Be Carnage; this was officially released as part of the No Way Home campaign on YouTube, named "Web of Lies!", in April 2022.

Simmons returned as J. Jonah Jameson, with Tony Revolori also returning as Eugene "Flash" Thompson. Marvel partnered with Sony Pictures to produce the videos, which follow the character in the immediate aftermath of Spider-Man: Far From Home, and the buildup to Spider-Man: No Way Home, while featuring numerous easter eggs to the MCU, including such events such as the criminal career and arrest of Adrian Toomes. In addition to archive footage of Tom Holland and Jake Gyllenhaal from the Spider-Man films, the videos also use original material, and footage showing the aftermath of Mysterio's attacks. The second season, primarily released through TikTok and later YouTube, features Angourie Rice as Betty Brant alongside Simmons, depicted as a new (unpaid) intern at TheDailyBugle.net put in charge of its TikTok account. The third season, also released through TikTok and taking place in the SSU, features Nicque Marina as a fictionalized version of herself, depicted as a new social correspondent at The Daily Bugle reporting on the crime spree of Dr. Michael Morbius; the No Way Home videos are released in a non-chronological order relative to the events of the film.

Release 
The first season was made available on TheDailyBugle.net YouTube channel, with some of them debuting in publications such as Facebook and The Mary Sue. TheDailyBugle.net videos also appear as bonus features on the Blu-ray release of Spider-Man: Far From Home (2019). The second and third seasons were made available on TheDailyBugle.net TikTok channel, with the official website redirected to it.

Supplementary material 
Other content released for the viral marketing campaigns include ongoing posts on social media sites such as Twitter and Instagram, as well as a real version of the fictional TheDailyBugle.net website. Inspired by real-world "conspiracy-pushing" websites such as that of Alex Jones, the website features Simmons reprising his role as Jameson in a video where he speaks out against Spider-Man and in support of Mysterio, before adding "Thanks for watching. Don't forget to like and subscribe!" The website includes testimonials from supposed victims of "the Blip", including one complaining that they disappeared in a dangerous situation and were seriously injured when they reappeared. This contradicts a statement by Feige saying that anyone in such a situation would have reappeared safely. Several days after this was pointed out, the website was updated to say this story was faked for an insurance claim; with the launch of the Spider-Man No Way Home campaign in November 2021, the website was redirected to TheDailyBugle.net TikTok account.

Reception

Critical response 
Aaron Perine of ComicBook.com praised the decision to have Simmons return as the character, summarizing their appearance with the meme "When you own a role so much that the first reboot doesn't show your character and the second reboot straight up brings you back", accompanied by a photograph of Simmons from Sam Raimi's Spider-Man 2 (2004) hysterically laughing. Josh Weiss of Syfy Wire complimented the web series and accompanying website, saying that "Hopefully, this isn't just a one-off thing for the DVD and Blu-ray release, because Sony can milk this thing for all it's worth and ramp up excitement for the next entry." Jessica Fisher of Geek Tyrant described Simmons' appearance as "awesome but not jaw-dropping" in reviewing the first episode. Eric Diaz of Nerdist described Simmons' role as a "real delight", saying that "[e]ven though he was missing his signature flat top, fans were more than fine with his updated version of Jonah", further describing the tie-in website as a "clever marketing push", praising its "striking resemble to certain famous conspiracy blogs that shall remain nameless [InfoWars, with] the site's whole aesthetic [being] pretty much spot on."

Accolades 
The TikTok campaign for Spider-Man: No Way Home was nominated for a Shorty Awards in the entertainment category.

Notes

References

External links 
 
 
 
 
 

2019 web series debuts
American news parodies
Fictional television shows
Marvel Cinematic Universe web series
Sony's Spider-Man Universe
Viral marketing